The Grand Prix of Figure Skating Final (formerly Champions Series Final), often shortened to Grand Prix Final and abbreviated as GPF, is a senior-level international figure skating competition. Medals are awarded in men's singles, ladies' singles, pair skating, and ice dancing. The event is the culmination of the ISU Grand Prix of Figure Skating series; skaters earn points for their placements and the top six from each discipline qualify to the Final.

Although not an ISU Championship, the Grand Prix Final has been considered by the International Skating Union to be the second most important competition (after the World Championships) in a season, ahead of the European Championships and the Four Continents Championships.

History
The first three editions of the competition were titled the Champions Series Final. The current name was first used in the 1998–99 season. The competition omitted the compulsory dance prior to the International Skating Union's decision to completely discontinue the segment.

The rules for the final have varied from year to year. In recent years, the skaters perform the short program in reverse order of their rankings, so the top scorer in the Grand Prix series skates last. The skating order for the free skate (free dance for ice dancers) is the reverse order of their placement in the short program or short dance, unlike other competitions where start orders are determined by a random draw.

Medalists

Men

Ladies

Pairs

Ice dancing

Cumulative medal count

References

 
Final
Figure skating records and statistics
Recurring sporting events established in 1995